Pareiorhina brachyrhyncha is a species of armored catfish endemic to Brazil where it is known from stony piedmont tributaries of the left bank of Rio Paraíba do Sul, in the State of São Paulo, southeastern Brazil. These streams belong to the Ribeirão Grande (also known as Teteqüera), Guameral, and Piagüi sub-drainages. They drain the southeastern slope of Serra da Mantiqueira, a major mountain range that separates the Paraíba do Sul from the upper Paraná River basin.  This species grows to a length of  SL.

References
 

Loricariidae
Fish of South America
Fish of Brazil
Endemic fauna of Brazil
Fish described in 2005